Mylothris ruandana is a butterfly in the family Pieridae. It is found in the Democratic Republic of the Congo, Uganda, Rwanda and Burundi. The habitat consists of forests.

The larvae feed on Loranthus species.

References

Butterflies described in 1909
Pierini